Bernhard Simmelbauer (born 20 June 1963) is a German gymnast. He competed at the 1984 Summer Olympics and the 1988 Summer Olympics.

References

External links
 

1963 births
Living people
German male artistic gymnasts
Olympic gymnasts of West Germany
Gymnasts at the 1984 Summer Olympics
Gymnasts at the 1988 Summer Olympics
People from Mühldorf
Sportspeople from Upper Bavaria